Events from the year 1751 in Ireland.

Incumbent
Monarch: George II

Events
5 October – the title Earl of Upper Ossory is created in the Peerage of Ireland in favour of John FitzPatrick, 2nd Baron Gowran.
The house which will become Áras an Uachtaráin is built in Phoenix Park, Dublin, by the park's Chief Ranger, politician Nathaniel Clements, to his own design.

Arts and literature
The actress Peg Woffington begins a 3-year residence in her native Dublin at Thomas Sheridan's Smock Alley Theatre.

Births
September – William Hare, 1st Earl of Listowel, peer and MP (died 1837).
19 October – Charles Edward Jennings de Kilmaine, soldier in France (died 1799).
30 October – Richard Brinsley Sheridan, playwright and statesman (died 1816).
Undated – Edward Marcus Despard, British colonel turned revolutionary (executed for high treason 1803).

Deaths
19 April – Peter Lacy, soldier, imperial commander in Russia (born 1678).

References

 
Years of the 18th century in Ireland
Ireland
1750s in Ireland